Lorenzo Di Livio (11 January 1997) is an Italian professional footballer who plays as a midfielder for  club Latina.

Career
Born in Turin, Di Livio is a youth product from Roma. He made his Serie A debut on 6 January 2016 against Chievo, replacing Mohamed Salah after 69 minutes.
In August 2016 he was loaned to Serie B side Ternana.

On 11 July 2017, he was signed by Reggina. Six days later, Di Livio was suspended for doping.

On 16 July 2019, he joined Catanzaro on a three-year contract.

Personal life
His father, Angelo was also a footballer, who played as a wing-back who played for Roma, Fiorentina, Juventus, and the Italian national team, among other teams.

Career statistics

References

1997 births
Living people
Footballers from Turin
Italian footballers
Association football midfielders
Serie A players
Serie B players
Serie C players
A.S. Roma players
Ternana Calcio players
Reggina 1914 players
Matera Calcio players
A.C.N. Siena 1904 players
U.S. Catanzaro 1929 players
Potenza Calcio players
Latina Calcio 1932 players